The Woodrow Wilson Pace was a harness racing major event for two-year-old Standardbred pacers run from 1977 through 2012 at the Meadowlands Racetrack in East Rutherford, New Jersey.

First run in 1977 for a purse of $280,000, by 1980 the purse was $2,011,000, making it the richest race of any breed in horse racing history.

Historical race events
No No Yankee won the inaugural running of the Woodrow Wilson Pace and went on to earn American Champion Two-Year-Old Male Pacer honors.

In 1984, the undefeated Nihilator won what would be the richest Woodrown Wilson Pace with a purse of $2,161,000. His winning time for the mile of 1:52 4/5 set a world record for 2-year-old Standardbred horses.

Records
 Most wins by a driver
 5 – John Campbell (1988, 1993, 1994, 1997, 2001)

 Most wins by a trainer
 2 – Joe Holloway (1992, 2003), Jim Campbell (1997, 2010), Robert McIntosh (1999, 2001), George Teague, Jr. (2005, 2009), Tony Alagna (2011, 2012)

 Stakes record
 1:49 3/5 – Captaintreacherous (2012)

Winners of the Woodrow Wilson Pace

† 2000: Ameripan Gigolo finished first but was disqualified for interference and set back to 10th place.

References

Horse races in New Jersey
Harness racing in the United States
Discontinued harness races